Paulo de Carvalho (born 15 May 1947) is a Portuguese singer.

Career
Carvalho co-founded the band The Sheiks in 1965. He sang and played the drums. He also played an instrumental role, either as a founder or a guest, of many other important Portuguese bands of the 1960s, among them bands such as Fluido, Banda 4 and Thilo's Combo. The Sheiks was Portugals answer to the Beatles. During the 1960s Portugal was ruled by an authoritarian dictatorship. This band came as a result of the climate in Portugal and captured the national mood. The people wanted the brightness of the Beatles sound and the Sheiks provided. The band sang songs such as Summertime, Missing You and Tell Me Bird. Though the band eventually broke up and Carvalho moved into contemporary Fado, the Sheiks have regrouped and performed in recent years.

As a solo performer, Carvalho participated in the Festival RTP da Canção and Eurovision Song Contest in 1974 and 1977. It was his song, the Portuguese entry for the Eurovision Song Contest, "E Depois do Adeus", which was used as the passcode at the beginning of the coup which toppled Portugal's dictatorship (in what has become known as the Carnation Revolution), giving Carvalho a permanent place in his country's history. During the 1970s and early 1980s, Carvalho won many international performance awards in Bulgaria, Poland and Belgium and was a strong participant in other music festivals in Chile, Argentina and Spain.

In 1985, Carvalho began professionally associating himself with Fado, deferring to Portugal's traditional music as globalization came to be seen as a threat to his homeland's cultural heritage; Desculpem qualquer coisinha was his first record following this shift, and (though controversial) remains his most commercially successful venture. Many of Carvalho's songs were written by José Nisa, José Calvário and Ary dos Santos as well as a poem by Alda Lara ("Mãe Negra"). He has worked with Fernando Tordo, Tozé Brito, Carlos Mendes and Os Amigos and performed duets with Brito, Tordo and Dulce Pontes, among others. Several greatest hits albums have been released.

Some of his best known songs are:
 "E Depois do Adeus" (1974 Eurovision Song Contest)
 "Flor sem Tempo"
 "Lisboa Menina e Moça"
 "Mãe Negra"
 "Os Meninos do Huambo"
 "Maria Vida Fria"
 "Nini"
 "Olá como estás?" (duet with Tozé Brito)
 "Pomba Branca" (duet with Dulce Pontes)
 "Domingo na praia"

Personal life
Carvalho has been married three times. His first marriage to Teresa Maria Lobato de Faria Sacchetti produced one child, singer Mafalda Sachetti. His second marriage to Helena Isabel produced one child, Bernardo, also a singer known as Agir. His last marriage with Fernanda Borges produced one child Paulo Nuno. He is currently in a partnership with artist Susana Lemos with whom he has two girls.

Style
Carvalho can be described as a new fadisto, singing a contemporary fado, as opposed to the fado of Amalia Rodrigues, whose songs were rooted in an older tradition. Carvalho's style fuses contemporary Portuguese pop with some traditional elements of fado. In many cases, his songs mix other Iberian or pan-European traditions, the song "Minh Alma" for example is more flamenco-pop than fado. This trend is visible throughout his career in fado. Carvalho takes from the wider world of ballads and adds elements of jazz, pop, or whatever else he sees fit into his songs, yet still maintains the result as fado.

Awards
Carvalho was awarded with medal of Ordem da Liberdade by Aníbal Cavaco Silva, President of Portugal, on 10 June 2009.

Discography
1969 Paulo de Carvalho;
1971 Eu;
1975 Não de Costas, Mas de Frente;
1976 MPCC;
1977 Paulo de Carvalho;
1978 Volume 1;
1979 Cantar de Amigos;
1980 Até me Deva Jeito;
1981 Cabra Cega;
1982 Cabra Cega;
1985 Desculpem Qualquer Coisinha;
1986 Homem Portugues;
1987 Terras da Lua Cheia;
1991 Gostar de Ti;
1994 Alma;
1995 33 Vivo;
1996 Fados Meus;
1999 Mátria;
2002 Antologia;
2004 Cores do Fado;
2006 Vida;
2008 Do Amor;
2011 Vivo: 50 Anos de Carreira;
2012 Duetos de Lisboa;
2017 Duetos;

References 

  7.Passado-Presente Uma Viagem ao Universo de Paulo de Carvalho, Soraia Simões

See also
 Portuguese music
 Eurovision Song Contest

1947 births
Living people
Singers from Lisbon
20th-century Portuguese male singers
Eurovision Song Contest entrants for Portugal
Eurovision Song Contest entrants of 1974
Eurovision Song Contest entrants of 1977